Xiao Xia (born 6 June 1991) is a Chinese athlete specialising in the 400 metres hurdles.  She represented her country at the 2015 World Championships in Beijing without advancing from the first round.

Her personal best in the event is 56.25 seconds set in Shenyang in 2013.  That year she was the gold medalist at the East Asian Games.

International competitions

References

External links
 

Chinese female hurdlers
Living people
Place of birth missing (living people)
1991 births
World Athletics Championships athletes for China
Athletes (track and field) at the 2014 Asian Games
Asian Games medalists in athletics (track and field)
Asian Games bronze medalists for China
Medalists at the 2014 Asian Games